Harold Hale Izard (July 4, 1939 – February 2, 2020) was an American politician who served in the New York State Assembly from the 140th district from 1975 to 1976.

He died on February 2, 2020, in Buffalo, New York at age 80.

References

1939 births
2020 deaths
Democratic Party members of the New York State Assembly